"Killing You" is a song by British rock band Asking Alexandria. It is the band's fourth single from their third studio album, From Death to Destiny. The single was released on 16 July 2013.

Music video 
In the music video, a girl is convinced to come to a secret party, which proves to be a torturing room for some other girls, oppressed by masked terrorists. The girl is scared by what's going on in the room, thinking that she will die next, and wants to walk away. The clip ends soon after the guardian sets her free from that torture place.

Track listing

Personnel 
 Danny Worsnop – lead vocals, additional guitar
 Ben Bruce – lead guitar, backing vocals
 Cameron Liddell – rhythm guitar
 Sam Bettley – bass
 James Cassells – drums

Asking Alexandria songs
2013 songs
2013 singles
Songs written by Ben Bruce
Songs written by Danny Worsnop
Sumerian Records singles